The 2016 Colonial Athletic Association men's basketball tournament was held March 4–7, 2016 at Royal Farms Arena in Baltimore, Maryland. The champion, UNC Wilmington, received an automatic bid to the 2016 NCAA tournament.

Seeds
All 10 conference teams were eligible for the tournament. The top 6 seeds received a bye to the Quarterfinals. Teams were seeded by record within the conference, with a tiebreaker system to seed teams with identical conference records.

Schedule

Bracket

* Denotes overtime period.

Game summaries

First round

Quarterfinals

Semifinals

Championship

Team and tournament leaders

Team leaders

See also
 Colonial Athletic Association
 2016 CAA women's basketball tournament

References

Colonial Athletic Association men's basketball tournament
Tournament
CAA men's basketball tournament
CAA men's basketball tournament
Basketball competitions in Baltimore
College sports tournaments in Maryland